Fairview Presbyterian Church may refer to:
Fairview Presbyterian Church (Lawrenceville, Georgia)
Fairview Presbyterian Church (Fountain Inn, South Carolina), listed on the NRHP in South Carolina